The Anglican Church of St Peter and St Paul in Kilmersdon, Somerset, England, dates back to the Norman period, though much of the current structure was built during the 15th and 16th centuries and restored in the Victorian era. It is a Grade I listed building.

The tower, which was built around 1443, is in four stages, includes corner buttresses with shafts and pinnacles, and is connected across the angle. The tower contains a ring of six bells, the heaviest being a tenor of 21 cwt. There are traceried 3-light bell-chamber windows with a dense quatrefoil interlace and blank 2-light windows on the two lower stages. The flanked niches were for statuary, however this is now missing.

The churchyard has a triangular lychgate designed by Sir Edwin Lutyens.

Several of the chest tombs and headstones in the churchyard are also listed buildings.

In 2013 the church was added to the Heritage at Risk Register because of the repairs needed to the roof and tower. In November 2013 a bell fell through two floors of the tower, but came to rest on rafters above the bellringers.

The parish is part of the benefice of Kilmersdon with Babington within the Diocese of Bath and Wells.

Gallery

See also

 List of Grade I listed buildings in Mendip
 List of towers in Somerset
 List of ecclesiastical parishes in the Diocese of Bath and Wells

References

External links 

15th-century church buildings in England
Churches completed in 1443
Towers completed in the 15th century
Grade I listed churches in Somerset
Church of England church buildings in Mendip District
Structures on the Heritage at Risk register in Somerset
Grade I listed buildings in Mendip District